Julián Alonso Pintor (born 2 August 1977) is a Spanish-American former professional tennis player, who turned professional in 1995 and retired in 2003. He was known in tennis because of his powerful serve and Forehand compared with the Goran Ivanišević´s service. In 1997, playing against Ivanisevic (2nd seeded), in Long Island, beat him for first Top 10 victory en route to semifinal and in that match fired a 143 mph serve to become just third player (Philippoussis, Rusedski) to register a serve of at least 143. He is the co-founder of ALONSO GOMEZ TEAM, a Tennis Academy located in Coral Gables FL (Biltmore Tennis Center) and co- Founder of ELITE TENNIS TEAM with Pere Riba in Barcelona (Club tennis Els Gorchs)  focusing on junior development and also is coaching pro players  Leylah Fernandez, Arantxa Rus  as many others before like, Qinwen Zheng, Mirjana Lučić-Baroni, Sabine Lisicki, Ajla Tomljanović, Varvara Lepchenko and Nicolas Almagro.

Married to Arantxa Vivanco and father of two children.

Tennis career
Alonso was awarded the ATP Newcomer of the Year prize after winning his first ATP title in Santiago and finishing in the Top 30 in 1997.  In the final of the tournament, he defeated Marcelo Ríos,  World No. 1 ranking 6–1, 6–2 in 46 min. Previously, that same year, Tim Henman after being defeated by Alonso at "The Lipton" Key Biscayne (current Miami open) declared: "Julian will be the next number 1 in the World before Wimbledon"

After this promising start, however, his career is considered underwhelming; he only won one more title (Bologna, 1998) and retired in 2003 after half year playing only Challengers. He confessed that the decline of his career started with the relationship with Martina Hingis. The pressure of the media and his mother-in-law made Alonso's ranking and self-confidence fall. He reached his career-high ATP singles ranking of world No. 29 in June 1998 (after winning his second and final title). He used to play doubles in Davis Cup Spanish team with Joan Balcells during Manolo Santana captaincy, and several single matches.

ATP career finals

Singles: 3 (2 titles, 1 runner-up)

Doubles: 3 (2 titles, 1 runner-up)

ATP Challenger and ITF Futures finals

Singles: 4 (2–2)

Doubles: 6 (2–4)

Performance timeline

Singles

Doubles

References

External links
 
 
 

1977 births
Living people
People from Canet de Mar
Sportspeople from the Province of Barcelona
Tennis players from Catalonia
People from Monte Carlo
Spanish expatriates in Monaco
Spanish male tennis players